Lagha is an Arabic surname. Notable people with the surname include:

 Khelil Lagha, Tunisian chess master
 Lufti Bin Swei Lagha (born 1968), citizen of Tunisia who was held in extrajudicial detention
 Zachary Lagha (born 1999), Canadian ice dancer

Arabic-language surnames